Su-style noodle (苏式汤面) is a traditional food dish in Suzhou, China. It is a combination of soup, noodles, and toppings.

Components

Soup 
There are two types of soup for Su-style noodles: red soup and white soup. Both types of soup start with a slowly cooked base soup. The recipe depends on the noodle restaurant. It can be eel bone, green shell snail, pork bone, chicken, pork, or ham. Brine is added to the base soup at a ratio of 10:1. The addition of soy sauce transforms white soup into red soup. This step is called "open soup" in the industry.

Noodles 
For noodles, the most important thing is to control the softness and hardness. They may be too mushy after being cooked too long or may be hard if they are not cooked long enough. You must tell the cook what level you want in advance, otherwise, it will depend on the cook.

Topping 
The toppings refer to the dishes eaten with noodles and they are rich in variety. Toppings almost cover the recipe of the Su Bang cuisine, such as 's stuffed hoof, Wufangzhai's five-spice ribs, Songhelou's braised duck, Huang Tianyuan's eel, and common braised eel meat, stir-fried meat, pork ribs, shrimps, stir-fried vegetarian with hot sauce, and more.

Location 
Su-style noodle is only popular among Yangtze River Delta due to its high cost and toppings are mostly made from local ingredients.

Maple Town Noodle 
Maple Town Noodle is a famous food of Jiangsu Maple Town. It is known as the "most difficult to make, finest, and most delicious" Su-style noodle. After a series of steps such as plucking and cleaning, high-quality pork belly are added as ingredients. It takes 4 and a half hours to cook the noodle and the soup is made of fresh ingredients like eel bone, shrimp brain, snail meat etc. The soup of Maple Town Noodle is always white soup, because no soy sauce is added.

See also
 List of noodle dishes

References 

Chinese noodle dishes